Sigmar is a masculine given name, and may refer to:

 Sigmar Berg (born 1975), Austrian artist, photographer, and fashion designer
 Sigmar Bieber (born 1968), German footballer
 Sigmar Gabriel (born 1959), German politician
 Sigmar Polke (1941–2010), German painter and photographer
 Sigmar Vilhjálmsson (born 1977), Icelandic television personality
 Sigmar Wittig (born 1940), German academic
 Sigmar Gabriel (born 1959), former German foreign minister

Masculine given names